Arthur Bowen may refer to:
 Arthur "Waring" Bowen (1922–1980), English solicitor who founded the charity British Rheumatism & Arthritis Association
 Arthur Bowen (actor) (born 1998), English actor